Lucia Recchia (born January 8, 1980 in Rovereto, Trentino) is an Italian Alpine skier.

References

External links
 

1980 births
Living people
People from Rovereto
Italian female alpine skiers
Alpine skiers at the 2002 Winter Olympics
Alpine skiers at the 2006 Winter Olympics
Alpine skiers at the 2010 Winter Olympics
Olympic alpine skiers of Italy
Alpine skiers of Fiamme Gialle
Sportspeople from Trentino